An air-to-surface missile (ASM) or air-to-ground missile (AGM) is a missile designed to be launched from military aircraft at targets on land or sea. There are also unpowered guided glide bombs not considered missiles. The two most common propulsion systems for air-to-surface missiles are rocket motors, usually with shorter range, and slower, longer-range jet engines. Some Soviet-designed air-to-surface missiles are powered by ramjets, giving them both long range and high speed.

Guidance for air-to-surface missiles is typically via laser guidance, infrared guidance, optical guidance or via satellite guidance signals. The type of guidance depends on the type of target. Ships, for example, may be detected via passive radar or active radar homing, less effective against multiple, small, fast-moving land targets.

There is some cross-over between air-to-surface missiles and surface-to-surface missiles. For example, there was an air-launched version of the Tomahawk missile, superseded by the AGM-86 ALCM. Other missiles used in both roles include the Penguin and AGM-84 Harpoon anti-ship missiles. Many air-to-surface missiles can be used against both ships and land targets, although some must be modified to perform a different role; for example, the AGM-84E Standoff Land Attack Missile is a land-attack version of the Harpoon.

A major advantage of air-to-surface missiles for ground attack by aircraft is the standoff distance they provide: missiles can be launched from a distance without coming within range of the target's air defences. Most air-to-surface missiles are fire-and-forget from a standoff distance, allowing the attacker to withdraw without approaching further after launch. Some missiles (typically cruise missiles or anti-ship missiles) have long enough range to be launched over the horizon, finding the target autonomously.

Sub-categories of air-to-surface missiles include:
air-launched anti-tank guided missiles (typically launched from helicopters)
air-launched cruise missiles
air-launched anti-ship missiles
anti-radiation missiles

Typically, the higher and faster the launching aircraft is flying, the longer the reach of a particular missile is. For long-range missiles this difference can be relatively small, but short-range missiles (like the AGM-65 Maverick) have a much longer range when launched at altitude.

There have been examples of air-launched ballistic missiles (Air Launched ICBM, GAM-87 Skybolt), but they are rare. Sometimes air-to-surface missiles are divided into the categories of tactical and strategic. Typically missiles with chemical explosive or small nuclear warheads are classed as tactical, and large nuclear warheads as strategic.

List of air-to-surface missiles

Argentina
MP-1000 Martín Pescador
AS-25K

Brazil
 MAR-1 Anti-radiation missile
 FOG-MPM Fiber Optics Guided Multiple Purpose Missile.
 AVTM-300 Cruise missile.

China
C-101
C-601
C-602
C-611
C-701
C-704 
C-705
C-801
C-802
C-805
Changfeng (missile) (Chang Feng 1)
Changfeng (missile) (Chang Feng 2)
DH-10
FL series (missile) 
FL-8
FL-9
FL-10
FL-7
HJ-8
HJ-9
HJ-10
HJ-73
HN-1
HN-3
HN-2
HY series 
KD1 (missile)
KD2 (missile)
KD-63
KD-88
LMD-002 (missile)
LMD-003 (missile)
Sky Arrow (missile)
Sky Arrow 90
SY series (missile) 
TBI (missile)
TL-6
TL-10
YJ-12
YJ-22
YJ-62
YJ-63
YJ-82
YJ-83
YJ-91
ZD1 (missile)

France
AS.11
AS.12
AS.15TT
AS.20
AS.30
AS.30 TCA
AS.30 Laser
AS.37 Martel
ARMAT
HOT
Exocet
Mistral
SCALP EG
TRIGAT LR
Apache
ASMP
ASMP-A
AASM
MLP
ANL

Germany
Taurus KEPD 350
ARMIGER
PARS 3 LR
HOT (missile)
AS.34 Kormoran
RBS-15 (in cooperation with Sweden)

Greece
HSC-1 Makedon

India

 BrahMos
 HeliNa (Dhruvastra)
 SANT
 Rudram-1
 NASM-SR

Israel
Popeye (missile)
Nimrod (missile)
Luz (missile)

Iran
Ghased 3
Zoobin
Bina
Sadid-1
Fajr-4
Sattar 1
Sattar 2
Sattar 3
Sattar 4
Ghaem

Japan
ASM-1
ASM-2
ASM-3

Norway
Penguin missile
Naval Strike Missile

Pakistan
Baktar-Shikan Air Launched variant
H-2 SOW
H-4 SOW
Ra'ad
Ra'ad-II
Barq
Takbir
GIDS REK
HAFR-1
HAFR-2
RPB-1

South Africa
Denel ZT3 Ingwe laser guided anti-tank guided missile
Denel Mokopa  air-to-ground missile
Kentron TORGOS air launched sub-sonic cruise missile (development cancelled)
Denel Small Guided Missile (in development)

Sweden
Rb 05
RBS 15

Taiwan
Hsiung Feng II
Sky Sword IIA  anti-radiation missile
Wan Chien

Turkey
Cirit
UMTAS
MAM (Smart Micro Munition)
MAM-C
MAM-L
MAM-T
 SOM (Air-Launched Cruise Missile)
Akbaba Anti-radiation missile (Currently in development)
TUBITAK-SAGE KUZGUN (Modern Modular Mutual Cost-effective Munition)
KUZGUN-TJ: Turbojet-powered variant.
KUZGUN-SS: Gliding variant.
KUZGUN-KY: Solid fuel rocket-powered variant.
BOZOK: Mini version of KUZGUN, specifically designed for UAVs.

UK
Blue Steel missile
Brimstone missile
Green Cheese missile (canceled in 1956)
ALARM
Storm Shadow
BAe Sea Eagle
GAM-87 Skybolt (air-launched ballistic missile; canceled)
Lightweight Multirole Missile
SPEAR 3

United States
AGM-12 Bullpup (no longer in service)
AGM-22 (project ceased in 1980s, still in limited use)
AGM-28 Hound Dog (no longer in service)
AGM-45 Shrike (no longer in service)
AGM-53 Condor (project cancelled)
AGM-62 Walleye (no longer in service)
AGM-63 (project cancelled)
AGM-64 Hornet (project cancelled)
AGM-65 Maverick (in service)
AGM-69 SRAM (no longer in service)
AGM-76 Falcon (project cancelled)
AGM-78 Standard ARM (no longer in service)
AGM-79 Blue Eye (project cancelled)
AGM-80 Viper (project cancelled)
AGM-83 Bulldog (project cancelled)
AGM-84 Harpoon (in service)
AGM-86 ALCM (in service)
AGM-87 Focus (no longer in service)
AGM-88 HARM (in service)
AGM-112 (reserved when program renamed GBU-15)
AGM-114 Hellfire (in service)
AGM-119 Penguin (in service)
AGM-122 Sidearm (no longer in service)
AGM-123 Skipper (out of service/no longer in service)
AGM-124 Wasp (project cancelled)
AGM-129 ACM (no longer in service)
AGM-130 
AGM-131 SRAM II (project cancelled)
AGM-136 Tacit Rainbow (project cancelled)
AGM-137 TSSAM (project cancelled)
AGM-142 Have Nap (in service)
AGM-153 (project cancelled)
AGM-154 JSOW (in service)
AGM-158 JASSM (in service)
AGM-159 JASSM (project cancelled)
AGM-169 Joint Common Missile (project cancelled)
AGM-176 Griffin (in service)
AGM-X  (in development)
Small Advanced Capabilities Missile (SACM) (in development)
Bold Orion (prototype)
GAM-87 Skybolt (air-launched ballistic missile; project cancelled)
High Virgo (prototype)
Hypersonic Air-breathing Weapon Concept (in development) 
AGM-179 JAGM (in development)
AGM-183A ARRW (in development)
LRSO (in development)

USSR/Russian Federation
R-82
S-5
S-8
S-13
S-24
S-25
Kh-15
Kh-20
Kh-22 (NATO: AS-4 Kitchen)
Kh-23/Kh-66 Grom (AS-7 Kerry; Russian: Х-23 Гром, "Thunder")
Kh-25 (AS-10 Karen)
Kh-29 (AS-14 Kedge)
Kh-31 (AS-17 Krypton)
Kh-32 (AS-4 Krypton)
Kh-38 
Kh-45
Kh-59 (AS-13 Kingbolt)
Kh-90 (AS-X-19 Koala)
KS-1 Komet (AS-1 Kennel)
K-10S (AS-2 Kipper)
Kh-20 (AS-3 Kangaroo)
Kh-22 (AS-4 Kitchen)
KSR-2 (AS-5 Kelt)
KSR-5 (AS-6 Kingfish)
Kh-23 Grom (AS-7 Kerry)
9K114 Shturm (AT-6 Spiral)
Kh-28 (AS-9 Kyle)
Kh-25 (AS-10 Karen)
Kh-58 (AS-11 Kilter)
Kh-25 (AS-12 Kegler)
Kh-59 (AS-13 Kingbolt)
Kh-29 (AS-14 Kedge)
Kh-47M2 Kinzhal (AS-24 Killjoy)
Kh-55 (AS-15 Kent)
Kh-15 (AS-16 Kickback)
Kh-31 (AS-17 Krypton)
AS-18 Kazoo (Kh-59M Ovod-M)
Kh-80 (AS-19 Koala)
Kh-35 (AS-20 Kayak)
Hermes-A

See also
 Surface-to-air missile
 Laser-guided bomb
 Anti-tank guided missile
 Anti-ship missile
 Cruise missile
 Anti-radiation missile
 Anti-surface warfare
 Air-to-ground weaponry

References

External links
 EADS - Cassidian division - Products
 DIEHL Defence: Guided Missiles
 Israel Military Industries Ltd. - Air-to-Ground Ammunition
 Kongsberg Gruppen
 Lockheed Martin - JASSM
 MBDA missile systems - solutions
 NTI.org - HiWING Mechanical & Electrical Technology Corporation
 Royal Air Force - Long Range Air-to-Surface weapons - Brimstone
 Raytheon Company - AGM-65 Maverick missile
 SAAB Group - Weapon systems
 TAURUS Systems GmbH

Missile types
Air-to-surface missiles